Kamancello II: Voyage is the second album by Canadian duo Kamancello Raphael Weinroth Browne, cellist and Shahriyar Jamshidi, Kamanche player. This album has released as a self-published project in CD format in Canada and digitally worldwide.
 
Kamancello II: Voyage is a full-length improvisation album consists of four tracks which are based on improvisation themes from West Asian and Western Classical music.

Track listing

Personnel 
 Shahriyar Jamshidi – Kamanche
 Raphael Weinroth-Brwone – cello
 Leon Taheny – recording and mixing
 Fedge – mastering
 Maahy – artwork
 Isaac Vallentin – layout

References 

Instrumental albums
Kamancello albums
2019 albums